Scolomastax is an extinct genus of paralligatorid neosuchian known from the Late Cretaceous Woodbine Formation in Texas. It contains a single species, S. sahlsteini.

References 

Crocodylomorphs